Tokyo Fiancée ( "Neither Eve nor Adam") is an autobiographical novel by the Belgian writer Amélie Nothomb. It appeared on 20 August 2007 published by Éditions Albin Michel.  A film adaptation was released in 2014.

The novel is partially concurrent with Nothomb's earlier novel, Fear and Trembling.

Plot
Amélie, a Belgian woman born in Japan, returns to her childhood home of Tokyo and dreams of living there. Amélie believes that the most effective way to learn Japanese is to teach French, so she meets Rinri, a sophomore studying French. The two become friends and lovers as they go from teacher to student.

The couple experience cultural differences. Amélie likes to taste Japanese food, while Rinri likes Western food. He prepares Japanese food for Amélie, but does not eat it himself. The Japanese things that Amélie admires are of no interest to Rinri. Rinri takes Amélie back to her memories of Japan. Amélie's Japanese improves rapidly thanks to Rinri, and so does Rinri's French.

When Rinri proposes to Amélie, she accepts but feels uncertain about how she feels about him. Instead of going through with the marriage, Amélie returns to Europe  when her employment contract with Yumimoto ends and does not contact Rinri.  Many years later, she returns to Japan on to promote her latest book.  She is reunited with Rinri at a book signing, where she warmly greets him as a long-lost brother.

Awards
The novel was nominated for the Prix Goncourt in 2007 and the Prix Renaudot 2007. It won Prix de Flore in 2007.

Press 

 May 30 2009 Lotus Reads: "a contemporary love story, where the woman's love of independence trumps her desire to be loved and needed."
 May 5 2009 Raintaxi: "Nothomb offers no false resolution of the novel’s conflict between personal freedom and emotional intimacy, and this unresolved tension makes Tokyo Fiancée convincing and compelling."
 Apr 4 2009 Amélie Nothomb Live on the Leonard Lopate Show
 Feb 19 2009 The Asian Review of Books: "Tokyo Fiancee is sparse, sardonic, intelligent, cross-culturally aware, simultaneously detached and engage"
 Feb 19 2009 The Temple News: "Tokyo Fiancée is either a love story about language or a language story about love."
 Feb 15 2009 Metropolis (Japan): "Nothomb skillfully uses the pair’s language exchange and intercultural relationship to offer deep insights into, and make sharp comments on, Japanese traditional culture and Bubble Era society."

Adaptations 
Tokyo Fiancée was adapted to the cinema in 2015 by Stefan Liberski. Amélie is played by the Belgian actress Pauline Étienne.

References

2007 Belgian novels
Novels by Amélie Nothomb
Novels set in Tokyo
Japan in non-Japanese culture
Éditions Albin Michel books
French-language novels
Belgian novels adapted into films